João Carlos Araújo Fonseca Silva (born 30 August 1989), known as Talocha, is a Portuguese professional footballer who plays for S.C. Farense as a left-back.

Club career
Born in Antas, Vila Nova de Famalicão, Talocha developed at F.C. Famalicão, and played his first senior matches for his hometown club in the lower divisions, including their 2008–09 nadir in the Braga Football Association's first district league. He transferred across the third tier to F.C. Vizela in 2013. On 17 December of the following year, he scored twice against Sporting CP in the last 16 of the Taça de Portugal, albeit in a 3–2 home loss.

On 29 May 2016, Talocha jumped two divisions to the Primeira Liga, signing for Boavista F.C. on a two-year deal. He made his professional debut in the season-opening 2–0 home win over F.C. Arouca, on 14 August. Having barely missed a game, he got his first goal on 14 January 2018 to open a win by the same score against Portimonense S.C. also at the Estádio do Bessa, after a free kick by David Simão.

When Talocha was about to become a free agent in May 2018, Boavista gave him a new deal for the next two years. A year later, he completed a century of appearances with the side from Porto in a match with C.S. Marítimo, amidst interest from other clubs.

On 5 August 2019, Talocha reached an agreement to end his contract with a year remaining and headed abroad for the first time, to Atromitos F.C. in Super League Greece; his former employers remained 20% of his economic rights. He switched to the Latvian Higher League the following transfer window, joining champions Riga FC.

Talocha returned to the Portuguese top flight on 7 August 2020, signing a two-year deal with Gil Vicente F.C.

References

External links

Portuguese League profile 

1989 births
Living people
People from Vila Nova de Famalicão
Sportspeople from Braga District
Portuguese footballers
Association football defenders
Primeira Liga players
Segunda Divisão players
F.C. Famalicão players
F.C. Vizela players
Boavista F.C. players
Gil Vicente F.C. players
S.C. Farense players
Super League Greece players
Atromitos F.C. players
Latvian Higher League players
Riga FC players
Portuguese expatriate footballers
Expatriate footballers in Greece
Expatriate footballers in Latvia
Portuguese expatriate sportspeople in Greece
Portuguese expatriate sportspeople in Latvia